Reihana Parata  (born 1937; also known as Aunty Doe) is a New Zealand Māori tohunga raranga (master weaver) from the Ngāi Tahu iwi. For 11 years Parata was matron at the Te Waipounamu Māori Girls' College in Christchurch.

Biography 
Parata grew up in Lyttelton, near Christchurch, New Zealand, and attended Lyttelton West Primary School where she first started weaving. 

In 1978, she was appointed matron at Te Waipounamu Māori Girls' College Christchurch, a position she held for 11 years. The focus of the college was on providing an education for Māori girls. While there, weaver Emily Schuster visited the college to teach the students weaving skills and Parata learnt alongside them.

Parata is a member of the Te Roopu Raranga Whatu o Aotearoa (National Collective of Māori Weavers in New Zealand). In 2008 Parata gained formal acknowledgement of her master weaver status in Aotearoa by being appointed to Te Kāhui Whiritoi by the management committee of Te Roopu Raranga Whatu and the New Zealand Māori Arts and Crafts Institute at Te Puia.

In 2016, Parata and Morehu Flutey-Henare worked together to design woven mats of welcome which were installed using coloured paving stones in the rebuild of the Bridge of Remembrance area in central Christchurch.

Recognition 
In the 1990 Birthday Honours list, Parata was awarded the Queen's Service Medal for public services, in recognition of her services to weaving.

Works 
Collaborations:

 Kahu Poa (collection of Korowai Tahi)
 Nga Here o Te Ao (collection of Te Roopu Raranga Whatu o Aotearoa)

References

External link
 Film of Parata weaving

1937 births
Living people
Recipients of the Queen's Service Medal
People from Lyttelton, New Zealand
New Zealand Māori weavers
Ngāi Tahu people